Bishnu Chattopadhyay alias Bistu Thakur (April, 1910 – April 11, 1971) was a Bangladeshi politician who was killed in the Bangladesh Liberation war. He was an Indian independence activist and leader of the peasant movement. He provided leadership to the Tebhaga movement that developed in the 1940s in undivided Bengal.

Early life
Chattopadhyay was born in a Bhadro lok family of Khulna District in British India. His father was Radhacharan Chattopadhyay. While studying in Naihati village school he left home and attracted with Sannyas life. After few days he returned home and joined in revolutionary politics. His brother Narayan Chattopadhyay and sister Bhanu Devi were also connected with the secret anti British activities under the disguise of Jessore Khulna Youth Society.

Career
While working in Khalispur Swaraj Ashram, Chattopadhyay was first arrested in 1929 in connection with a case of  political dacoity. But released without having evidences. He participated in Civil disobedience movement and detained in Bengal Criminal Case Act on 2 May 1930. In next three years of imprisonment he became influenced in Marxism by the communist leaders like Bhabani Sen, Pramatha Bhaumik and Abdur Rezzak Khan. Soon after the release he became a member of Communist Party of India and started work as a peasant organiser.

Chattopadhyay constructed the Shovana dam over the Shakhabahi river and Nabeki dam organising thousands of farmers in front of the goons of landlords and police forces. In 1940 in his leadership 21 thousand acres land were distributed to the landless people. Chattopadhyay became a heroic figure of the peasant uprising in Dumuria, Batiaghata area and Khulna District. His name itself became myth to the common people. He was popularly known as Bishtu Thakur. He organised peasants conference in 1939 and 1944 covering two districts. In Maubhag area a regional peasant conference was also organised by him in 1946. After and before partition of Bengal (1947) he remained under preventive detention and tortured for 24 years of his life. In Khulna jail, one of his fellow inmates was Sheikh Mujibur Rahman, the future President of Bangladesh.

Chattopadhyay was a man of versatile talents. He made night school for the peasants and adult education center, Lokshikkha Sansad under Visva-Bharati University. He had experience with agricultural science and veterinary treatments. In 1969 he also published a collection of his articles named Mehanati Manush.

Death
On 11 April 1971, he was brutally murdered by the Rajakar and Muslim League agents at the time of Bangladesh Liberation War.

References

1910 births
1971 deaths
People killed in the Bangladesh Liberation War
People from Khulna District
Indian revolutionaries
Revolutionary movement for Indian independence
Peasant revolts
Bangladeshi politicians
Bengali Hindus
Bangladeshi Hindus
Prisoners and detainees of British India
Pakistani Hindus
Bangladeshi Marxists